Year 1454 (MCDLIV) was a common year starting on Tuesday (link will display the full calendar) of the Julian calendar.

Events 
January–December
 February 4 – Thirteen Years' War: The Secret Council of the Prussian Confederation sends a formal act of disobedience to the Grand Master, and the citizens of Toruń rebel against the Teutonic Knights, beginning the conflict.
 March 6 – Casimir IV of Poland renounces allegiance to the Teutonic Knights.
 March 27 – Richard Plantagenet, Duke of York, becomes Protector for King Henry VI of England, who is in a catatonic state.
 April 9 – Treaty of Lodi: Francesco Sforza forms a triple alliance between the Duchy of Milan, the Republic of Florence and Kingdom of Naples.
 August – In Moldavia, Petru Aron retakes the throne from Alexăndrel.
 September 18 – Thirteen Years' War – Battle of Chojnice: The Polish army is defeated by a smaller but more professional Teutonic army.
 December – King Henry VI of England having regained his sanity dismisses the Duke of York as Protector.

Date unknown
 The press of Johannes Gutenberg (at Mainz on the Rhine) produces the first printed documents bearing a date.
 Isaac Zarfati sends a circular letter to Rhineland, Swabia, Moravia and Hungary, praising the happy conditions of the Jews under the crescent, in contrast to the "great torture chamber" under the cross, and urging them to come to the Ottoman Empire.
 The Statutes of Nieszawa are enacted in Poland. 
 The Drought of One Rabbit is recorded in Aztec history.

Births 
 June 3 – Bogislaw X, Duke of Pomerania (1474–1523) (d. 1523)
 June 16 – Joanna of Aragon, Queen of Naples (d. 1517)
 July 14 – Poliziano, Italian humanist (d. 1494)
 September 4 – Henry Stafford, 2nd Duke of Buckingham, English politician (d. 1483)
 September 24 – Gerold Edlibach, Swiss historian (d. 1530)
 November 25 – Catherine Cornaro, Queen of Cyprus (d. 1510)
 date unknown
 Domenico Maria Novara da Ferrara, Italian astronomer (d. 1504)
 Pinturicchio, Italian painter (d. 1513)
 Choe Bu, Korean official and venturer to China (d. 1504)
 Alexander Stewart, Duke of Albany (d. 1485)

Deaths 
 March 22 – John Kemp, Archbishop of Canterbury
 July 20 – King John II of Castile (b. 1405)
 December 10 – Ignatius Behnam Hadloyo, Syriac Orthodox Patriarch of Antioch.
 date unknown
 Chiara Zorzi, regent of Athens
 William Turnbull, Bishop of Glasgow
 Robert Wingfield, English politician (b. 1403)

References